is a railway station in the city of Nagano, Japan, operated by the private railway operating company Nagano Electric Railway.

Lines
Shinano-Yoshida Station is a station on the Nagano Electric Railway Nagano Line and is 4.3 kilometers from the terminus of the line at Nagano Station.

Station layout
The station consists of two opposed side platforms serving two tracks, with an elevated station building. The station is staffed.

Platforms

Adjacent stations

History
It was renamed to its present name on 5 October of the same year.

Passenger statistics
In fiscal 2016, the station was used by an average of 1492 passengers daily (boarding passengers only).

Surrounding area
Yoshida Elementary School
Nagano Higashi Middle School
Nagano Yoshida High School

See also
 List of railway stations in Japan

References

External links

 

Railway stations in Japan opened in 1926
Railway stations in Nagano (city)
Nagano Electric Railway